Raquel Kops-Jones and Abigail Spears successfully defended their title, defeating Chan Hao-ching and Janette Husárová in the final, 6–4, 6–1.

Seeds

Draw

Draw

External links
 Main draw

Southern California Open - Doubles
2013 Doubles